Joshua Henry Jones Jr. (? - December 14, 1955) was a composer, poet, and novelist. He was photographed in 1923. His poem "To a Skull" was included in James Weldon Johnson's 1922 book The Book of American Negro Poetry. Robert Thomas Kerlin included him in his 1923 poetry anthology Negro Poets and Their Poems.

Early life
He was born in Orangeburg, South Carolina and grew up in South Carolina. His father was a bishop in the A.M.E. church.

Career
His poems were published, including one collection called "Poems of the Four Seas". He also wrote the novel By Sanction of Law about a marriage between an African American man and a Caucasian woman. It was published in 1924 by B. J. Brimmer Company in Boston. It was loosely based on his own experiences. It was banned from the Boston Public Library system. In 1923, he wrote the words for Boston's official hymn, "Dear Old Boston".

He studied at Ohio State University and Yale University. He graduated from Brown University. He married his college sweetheart, a sculptor and Canadian immigrant. They had two children. He was referred to as Boston's poet laureate.

He wrote about Boston Common in Our Boston. Some of his poems addressed World War I.

Books

Poetry
The Heart of the World (1919)
Poems of the Four Seas (1921)

Novels
By Sanction of Law (1924), dedicated to his father and Boston mayor James M. Curley

References

Year of birth missing (living people)
1955 deaths
African-American male composers
20th-century American composers
African-American poets
20th-century American poets
American male poets
African-American novelists
20th-century African-American writers
Novelists from Massachusetts
American male novelists
People from Orangeburg, South Carolina
Writers from Boston
Brown University alumni